Pierre Jacotin (1765–1827) was the director of the survey for the Carte de l'Égypte (Description de l'Égypte), the first triangulation-based map of Egypt, Syria and Palestine.

The maps were surveyed in 1799-1800 during the campaign in Egypt and Palestine of Napoleon.

After his return from Egypt, Jacotin worked on preparing the plates for publication, but in 1808 Napoleon formally made them state secrets and forbade publication. This was apparently connected with Napoleon's efforts at the time to  establish an alliance with the Ottomans.

It was not until 1828-30 that the engraved plates could be published.

References

Bibliography

Further reference
 
 
 (Pierre Jacotin: pp. 437-652, “Syria”: pp. 594-609 )

External links
 Jacotin maps at the David Rumsey Historical Map Collection .

1765 births
1829 deaths
French cartographers
French geographers
French explorers
Commission des Sciences et des Arts members
Burials at Père Lachaise Cemetery
Cartographers of the Middle East